Shy is an adjective describing a person with shyness.　Shyness as a characteristic of infant children is covered at stranger anxiety.

Shy or SHY may also refer to:

Shy (company), an Italian women's shoe brand
Soft hyphen (HTML character entity &shy;), an indication of an optional hyphenation point in a word
 Shawiya language, ISO 639-3code
Shy (manga), a Japanese manga series written and illustrated by Bukimi Miki

Codes and symbols 
IATA airport code for Shinyanga Airport
ICAO code for Sky Airlines

People 
Carl Shy (1908–1991), American basketball player
Christopher Shy, artist
 Shy Arkin (born 1965), Israeli biochemist
Shy Carter, American songwriter
Shy Keenan, British author
Shy Martin, Swedish artist

Music 
Shy (band), UK
SHY & DRS, Scots singing duo
"Shy", a song by Prince from The Gold Experience
"Shy", a 2000 song on Sonata Arctica's albums Successor and Takatalvi
 Shy (album)

Sport 
 Scottish term for a throw-in in football and the equivalent in shinty